Haroun Loum Tchaouna (born 14 May 2000) is a Chadian professional footballer who plays as a forward for Dijon II and the Chad national team.

Club career
Tchaouna is a youth product of Rennes, and began his career with their reserves in 2017. He spent the 2019-20 season in Italy with Caravaggio in the Serie D, before returning to Rennes reserves the following season. He once more went to Italy in 2020 with Valcalepio. In 2021, he again returned to France with Dijon II in the Championnat National 3.

International career
Tchaouna debut with the Chad national team in a 3–1 2022 FIFA World Cup qualification loss to Sudan on 5 September 2019.

Personal life
Tchaouna is the older brother of the French footballer Loum Tchaouna.

References

External links
 
 

2000 births
Living people
People from N'Djamena
Chadian footballers
Chad international footballers
Association football midfielders
Stade Rennais F.C. players
U.S.D. Caravaggio players
Dijon FCO players
Championnat National 3 players
Serie D players
Chadian expatriate footballers
Chadian expatriates in France
Expatriate footballers in France
Chadian expatriates in Italy
Expatriate footballers in Italy